Syed Sardar Ali Shah is a Pakistani politician who is the currently serving as Provincial Minister of Sindh for Education, Culture, Tourism, and Antiquities and Archives . He has been a member of the Provincial Assembly of Sindh since August 2018.

Previously, he was member of the Provincial Assembly of Sindh from May 2013 to May 2018 and served as Provincial Minister of Sindh for Culture, Tourism and Antiquities, and Archives between August 2016 and May 2018.

Early life and education
He was born on 4 December 1974 in Umerkot District Pakistan.

He has the degrees of Bachelor of Arts, Bachelor of Laws, and Master of Laws.

Political career

He started his political career while contesting as UC Nazim in local bodies election in 2001-2002 and was elected from his native village UC.

He was elected to the Provincial Assembly of Sindh as a candidate of PPP from Constituency PS-69 (Umerkot-cum-Sanghar) in 2013 Pakistani general election. He received 35,069 votes and defeated Muhammad Jadam Mangrio. On 30 July 2016, he was inducted into the provincial Sindh cabinet of Chief Minister Syed Murad Ali Shah and was appointed as Provincial Minister of Sindh for Culture, Tourism and Antiquities. In May 2017, he was given the additional ministerial portfolio of Archives.

He was re-elected to the Provincial Assembly of Sindh as a candidate of PPP from Constituency PS-51 (Umerkot-I)	in 2018 Pakistani general election.

On 19 August 2018, he was inducted into the provincial Sindh cabinet of Chief Minister Syed Murad Ali Shah and was appointed as Provincial Minister of Sindh for Education with the additional ministerial portfolio of Culture, Tourism, and Antiquities.

Later, he was succeeded by Saeed Ghani as education minister on 3 February 2020. He was again appointed as Minister of Education on 5 August 2021.

References

1974 births
Living people
Sindhi people
Pakistan People's Party MPAs (Sindh)
People from Umerkot District
Sindh MPAs 2013–2018
Sindh MPAs 2018–2023